The Socotra sunbird (Chalcomitra balfouri) is a species of bird in the family Nectariniidae. It is endemic to Socotra.

Its natural habitats are tropical dry shrubland, tropical moist shrubland, and tropical high-altitude shrubland. It is threatened by habitat loss.

References

Socotra sunbird
Endemic birds of Socotra
Socotra sunbird
Socotra sunbird
Taxonomy articles created by Polbot